Radha Vembu (born 1972/1973) is an Indian billionaire businesswoman and the owner of a majority stake in  Zoho Corporation, an Indian software development company.

Early life 
Vembu has a degree in industrial management from the Indian Institute of Technology Madras.

Career 
Zoho Corporation was co-founded by her and her brother Sridhar Vembu, who started the business in 1996 as AdventNet. She owns a majority stake in the company and is a product manager for email service, Zoho Mail, and also the director of Corpus Foundation. She actively keeps herself away from the limelight.

Personal life 
Vembu is married, with one child, and lives in Chennai, Tamil Nadu, India.

References

1970s births
Living people
Indian billionaires
Female billionaires
People from Chennai
IIT Madras alumni
Place of birth missing (living people)